The 1917 Purdue Boilermakers football team was an American football team that represented Purdue University during the 1917 college football season. In their second season under head coach Cleo A. O'Donnell, the Boilermakers compiled a 3–4 record, finished in last place in the Big Ten Conference with an 0–4 record against conference opponents, and were outscored by their opponents by a total of 109 to 95. William J. Berns was the team captain.

Schedule

References

Purdue
Purdue Boilermakers football seasons
Purdue Boilermakers football